Psycho the Rapist, released on October 2, 2007, is the eighth album by Acumen Nation.

Name
The name Psycho the rapist is a jocular rebracketing of psychotherapist.

Track listing
 "Fanglorious" - 4:57
 "Hatchet Harry" - 4:16
 "Elective Surgical Strike" - 4:34
 "Sirvix"  - 5:05
 "No Imagination" - 6:17
 "Remedial Math" - 4:37
 "Idle Lysergic Corpse" - 6:44
 "Holy Terror" - 5:26
 "200 Bodies Per Minute" - 5:05
 "Penultimatum" - 7:57
 "Acumen Trepanation" - 10:37

Personnel
Written, performed and produced by Jason Novak
Live drums by Dan Brill
Additional sounds by Jamie Duffy
Additional programming on "Holy Terror" by Sean Payne
Special hi-hat programming on "Closer" by D. Broussier

References

2007 albums
Acumen Nation albums